Faction or factionalism may refer to:

 Political faction, a group of people with a common political purpose
 The Faction, a Californian punk rock band
 Faction (Planescape), a political faction in the game Planescape
 Faction (literature), a type of historical novel based on fact
 Factions (Divergent)
 Faction fighting, an English term for Irish mass stick fights, see Bataireacht

See also